Heikki Theodor Suolahti (2 February 1920 – 27 December 1936) was a Finnish composer.

Suolahti was born and died in Helsinki, where he studied under Arvo Laitinen in Helsinki from 1929 until his death. In 1935, he composed Sinfonia piccola, which was first performed in February 1938 under Tauno Hannikainen. Hannikainen also orchestrated some of Suolahti's songs. Sinfonia piccola was published in the United States in 1959. When the composer died at the age of 16, none of his works had been performed publicly yet. He left the opera Pärttylin yö and a few other works unfinished.

Suolahti, a huge admirer of Richard Wagner, was promised a trip to the Bayreuth Festival in the summer of 1937, but he died soon after Christmas 1936.

Jean Sibelius was fascinated with Sinfonia piccola and praised it to Suolahti's mother after the composer's untimely death.

Works
The following works are largely unpublished, but are archived at the Helsinki University Library.

Orchestral
 Symphony no.1 in b minor (sinfonia piccola h-molli) (1935)
 Prélude pour petit orchestre dédié à mon père, Op.6
 Fantasia-Impromptu, Op.9 (1932)
 Hades, Op.10 Symphonic poem (1932)

Concerto
 Piano concerto no.1, Op.15 (1934)
  Violin concerto, Op.16 (1934)

Chamber music 
 String Quartet (1936)
 String Quartet No.1, Op.4 (Quartetto piccola)
 String Quartet No.2, Op.8 (1933)
 Piano Quintet

Violin and piano
 Valsette, Op.7, no.3
 Novelette, Op.7
 Pastorale (1933)
 Three small pieces, Op.24 (1934) Prélude, sérénade, romance
 Fantasia
 Serenade

Piano
 Two small pieces, Op.5, no.1-2 (1933) Rêverie, Sur l'Onde
 Romance
 Sonatine and Rondo

Voice
 Hyökyaalto for voice, piano and orchestra (lyrics by V.A.Koskenniemi)
 Unten kalastaja for voice, piano and orchestra (Lyrics by Einari Vuorela)
 Kesäyössä for voice, piano and orchestra (lyrics by V.A.Koskenniemi)
 Endymion for voice and piano (lyrics by V.A.Koskenniemi)
 Huomisehtoo for voice and piano (lyrics by V.A.Koskenniemi)

Opera
 Pärttylin yö (incomplete)

References

External links
The Finnish Music Information Centre on Suolahti

 List of all archived works at the National Library of Finland

Finnish male composers
Musicians from Helsinki
1920 births
1936 deaths
20th-century male musicians
20th-century Finnish composers